Mara Clara is a Philippine drama television series on ABS-CBN, which aired from August 17, 1992, to February 14, 1997, replacing Sebya, Mahal Kita and was replaced by Esperanza. The series stars Judy Ann Santos and Gladys Reyes. It was the longest running ABS-CBN weekday drama and on Philippine television until June 26, 2020, when FPJ's Ang Probinsyano surpassed it upon airing its 1,166th episode. It was adapted into a feature film released by Star Cinema in 1996. Mara Clara was a first release from Dreamscape Entertainment. 

The title is derived from María Clara, the mestiza heroine of José Rizal’s Noli Me Tángere.

This series is currently streaming on Jeepney TV YouTube Channel every 1:00 pm and 1:30 pm.

Plot
Mara and Clara were switched at birth, and the details of this event were recorded by Kardo (Dan Fernandez), a hospital staff, in his diary. Mara (Judy Ann Santos) lived as the poor daughter of the couple Susan (Susan Africa) and Gary Davis (Eruel Tongco/William Martinez) while Clara (Gladys Reyes), their real daughter, was brought up the rich Amanthe (Juan Rodrigo) and Almira Del Valle (Beverly Vergel).

The good-natured Del Valle couple (Juan Rodrigo and Beverly Vergel) takes in Mara (Judy Ann Santos) as a servant and decides to spend for her education, not knowing that she is their real daughter. Gary (Eruel Tongco/William Martinez), who is actually a gang and syndicate leader, approves of the idea that Mara lives with the Del Valles to extort money. Clara makes life for Mara difficult. But, as time progresses they find out their true identity in the spotlights, damages are paid, and they all know where to stand.

Cast and characters

Main cast
Judy Ann Santos as Mara Davis / Mara del Valle
Gladys Reyes as Clara del Valle / Clara Davis

Supporting cast
Juan Rodrigo as Amante del Valle
Beverly Vergel as Almira Castillo-del Valle
Eruel Tongco (Series, 1992-1996) and William Martinez (Movie version) as Gary Davis
Susan Africa as Susan Davis
Noel Colet/Jeffrey Santos as Enrico Castillo/Enrico David
Dan Fernandez as Kardo Davis
Leni Santos as Lenita
Maila Gumila as Gary's Sister
Naty Mallares as Lola Binay
Minnie Aguilar as Lagring
Michael "Eagle" Riggs as CG
Wowie de Guzman as Christian Torralba
Christopher Roxas as Erris Reyes
Paolo Contis as Jepoy
Jochelle Olalia as Karen
Agatha Tapan as Denise
Carol Magallanes as Carol
Anita Linda as Pacita
Ian Galliguez as Bekya
Tom Santos
Anna Lumibao
Whitney Tyson as Querubin
Rose Zen Lopez 
Jane Zaleta 
JR Herrera 
Jeffrey Hidalgo

Recurring
Piolo Pascual
Rico Yan as Derick Gonzales
Angelika Dela Cruz as Joyce

Production

After the cancellation of "Ula: Batang Gubat", director Emil Cruz Jr. conceptualized a soap opera entitled "Mara Clara" and was presented to ABS-CBN for approval. Judy Ann Santos and Gladys Reyes were handpicked by the director for the titular roles. During the early years of the soap, majority of scenes, particularly the Del Valle mansion are shot inside the studio. It was near the end of Book 1 towards Book 2 that the series started shooting on an actual location.

On May 19, 1996, cast members Eruel Tongco, Ireneo Sevilla, Joy Clarise Cojuangco and Bienvenido dela Rosa died when their vehicle fell into a ravine in Palayan while driving home from a Nueva Ecija stage presentation.

Broadcast

Timeslot
The series originally aired at 2:30 p.m. as a blocktimer produced by its original director Emil Cruz, Jr. from August 17, 1992, until September 30, 1994, after Anna Luna. It moved to a 2:00 p.m. timeslot on October 3, 1994, when its predecessor Anna Luna moved from the said network to RPN. The show's rights was later on purchased by ABS-CBN Entertainment and was moved to a primetime slot on July 8, 1996 after TV Patrol to challenge RPN's Tagalog-language dub of Mexican telenovela, Marimar.  It ended on February 14, 1997 to make way for Esperanza as the replacement on February 17.

Reruns
The series re-aired in 2007 by affiliates Studio 23 (now S+A) and Kapamilya Channel (internationally subsidiary of The Filipino Channel) through 2008. It aired internationally in 1994 til its series finale on The Filipino Channel when it first aired as same day airings. It then re-aired in 2007-2008 for the first time on the Kapamilya Channel.

Adaptations

Film adaptation
In 1996, a movie was produced based on the television series. The Mara Clara movie adaptation was the first television series created by ABS-CBN to be adapted by Star Cinema. On the adaptation, the only cast changed was the character of Gary Davis who was portrayed by Eruel Tongco in the television, and was played by William Martinez in the movie due to Tongco's death from a car accident in 1996.

Remake

During the ABS-CBN trade event held on August 24, 2010, at the World Trade Center Manila, it was announced that a remake of the series will start its production in 2010. Kathryn Bernardo is slated for the role of Mara, with Julia Montes as Clara. It aired on ABS-CBN from October 25, 2010, to June 3, 2011.

Difference between series and movie

Reception
The series had its highest rating of 45% in one of its episode in 1994, it is considered as one of the most highest rating Filipino TV series of all time.

The TV series made waves through most of the Filipino audience and being called by ABS-CBN as, "Ina ng Pinoy Soap Opera" owing to the series' huge success.

However, some of the viewer base has shown a negative response for the character of Clara; played by Gladys Reyes, due to its violent actions done throughout the series against Judy's character, Mara, which provoked a huge reaction on those who viewed the show's protagonist Mara, more favorably. As a result, the viewers and netizens tagged Gladys Reyes as the "Bella Flores of the 90's".

Notes

See also
List of programs broadcast by ABS-CBN
List of telenovelas of ABS-CBN
Mara Clara (2010 TV series)

References

External links

ABS-CBN drama series
1992 Philippine television series debuts
1997 Philippine television series endings
Filipino-language television shows
Television shows set in the Philippines
Television series about teenagers
Television series by Dreamscape Entertainment Television